CybageAsha is a charitable registered trust founded under the Bombay Public Trust Act, 1950, in October 2003. The primary aims of the foundation are rural development, alcohol deaddiction, social welfare, and go green initiative. The foundation is based in Pune, India, and is run by Ritu Nathani, Director Cybage and Managing Trustee CybageAsha and CybageKhushboo. These philanthropic initiatives actively contribute in educational and socioeconomic drives, aiming at the development of the less fortunate for a better society. The trust believes in ‘Spreading Smiles’.

References

External links
 Official site

Foundations based in India
Charities based in India
Non-profit organisations based in India
Social welfare charities
2003 establishments in Maharashtra